Edward Harper was a British engineer who travelled to Colombo in 1921 to work in the Ceylon Telegraph Department. Harper was appointed Chief Engineer. He had an innovative mind and his passion was broadcasting. Edward Harper is known as the 'Father of Broadcasting,' in Ceylon.

The launching of broadcasting in Ceylon
Harper together with Ceylonese and English radio enthusiasts founded the Ceylon Wireless Club. They experimented with radio broadcasts in 1923 the first experiments took place from a tiny room in the Central Telegraph Office - gramophone music was broadcast with the aid of a small transmitter captured from a German submarine. The transmitter was built by Ceylon Telegraph engineers. This was historic because it happened three years after the inauguration of broadcasting in Europe. Ceylon plays an equal role in the beginnings of broadcasting alongside Europe and the United States of America.

Colombo Radio

On 16 December 1925 a regular broadcasting service was launched in Colombo. The radio station was known as Colombo Radio, adopting the call sign, 'Colombo Calling.' As a result of Edward Harper's efforts and that of the pioneering Ceylonese engineers, Radio Ceylon came into being - it is the oldest radio station in South Asia. Radio Ceylon ruled the airwaves in the region and became an established brand where international broadcasting was concerned.

The inauguration of radio, changed Ceylonese society. Families used to get together in the morning or in the evening and listen to the radio. Radio Ceylon enjoyed unique status as the market leader in South Asia from the 1950s - 1960s. Sri Lanka now has several radio stations and television stations. The media revolution was made possible by those early experiments conducted by Edward Harper and the Ceylonese radio enthusiasts who changed the face of communication on the island. Sri Lanka occupies an important place in the history of broadcasting - radio services were launched just three years after the inauguration of the BBC in London.

Eighty Years of Broadcasting in Sri Lanka
In December 2005, Sri Lanka celebrated 80 years in broadcasting, a historic landmark in the world of broadcasting - thanks to the pioneering efforts of broadcasting giants like Edward Harper. In January 2007 the Sri Lanka Broadcasting Corporation, formerly known as Radio Ceylon, commemorated forty years as a public corporation.

See also
Vernon Corea
Radio Ceylon
Sri Lanka Broadcasting Corporation
Sri Lanka
History of broadcasting

References

External links
Sri Lanka Broadcasting Corporation - Live Streaming
Radio Ceylon/Sri Lanka Broadcasting Corporation (SLBC): The Story of Broadcasting in Sri Lanka - Photograph of Edward Harper
Radio Ceylon Facebook Group
Sri Lanka Broadcasting Corporation Facebook Group
Radio Ceylon
BBC Radio 4 - Empire Stories
SLBC Celebrates 40 Years in Broadcasting
Eighty Years of Broadcasting in Sri Lanka - Daily News, Colombo
A brief history of radio and radio drama - Sunday Observer, Colombo

British broadcasters
English engineers
Year of birth missing
Year of death missing
Sri Lankan people of British descent